Holding the Baby is a 1997 UK sitcom television series produced by Granada Television that aired on ITV. It lasted for two series. The series' average audience in 1997 was 6.85 million viewers, making it the 16th-highest rated British sitcom that year.

It was later remade in the United States for Fox Television in 1998; the U.S. version lasted only one season.

References

External links

1997 British television series debuts
1998 British television series endings
1990s British sitcoms
ITV sitcoms
Television series by ITV Studios
English-language television shows
Television shows produced by Granada Television
Television series by 20th Century Fox Television